Shweta, known by her stage name Rakshita, is an Indian television personality, film producer and former actress known for her work in Kannada cinema.

Early life
Rakshita was brought up in Bangalore. Her father B. C. Gowrishankar was a cinematographer and mother Mamatha Rao, an actress, both of whom worked in Kannada films. Rakshita underwent an acting course under Krishnamurthy Kavathar's tutelage for about 15 days before entering films. Pursuing a bachelor's degree in computer applications (BCA) from Sri Bhagawan Mahaveer Jain College in Bangalore at the time, she discontinued during the first year before enrolling in a correspondence course for a Bachelor of Arts degree in 2001. During this time, she was signed to play the lead opposite Puneeth Rajkumar in Appu (2002) by producer Parvathamma Rajkumar who gave her the name Rakshita.

Career

Actor 
Rakshita started her career with the Kannada movie Appu with Puneeth Rajkumar. She also acted in remakes of the same movie in Telugu titled Idiot and in Tamil titled Dum alongside Silambarasan. She became a top Kannada heroine when Kalasipalya became a big hit. Apart from Puneeth Rajkumar, she formed a successful pair with all the top Kannada heroes of the time - Upendra, Sudeep, Darshan and Aditya. She has also acted with big time heroes such as Chiranjeevi, Nagarjuna Akkineni,Mahesh Babu, Jr NTR, Jagapathi Babu, Vishnuvardhan, V. Ravichandran, Shivarajkumar,  Vijay,  Ravi Teja,  and Silambarasan

After her marriage to director Prem, she cut down on her acting assignments and took over film-making. She turned producer for the prestigious Jogayya directed by Prem, starring Shivarajkumar in the lead (100th movie).

Politics 
Rakshita announced that she had joined the Badavara Shramikara Raitara (BSR) Congress in March 2012, after politician B. Sriramulu announced of founding it, which eventually happened in 2013. She served as the President of the women's wing of the BSR Congress till April 2013, when she quit the party citing differences with the party members over contesting elections from a constituency of her choice at the Karnataka Legislative Assembly election. In the same month, she joined the Janata Dal (Secular). She again had differences with the party over its ignoring her plea for a ticket to contest from Mandya at the 2014 general election, and quit in March 2014, joining the Bharatiya Janata Party (BJP). Following this, she became subject to media and public ridicule, and was called a "party-hopper", having changed 3 political parties in two years.

Personal life
She is married to film director Prem since 2007.

Filmography

As producer

As actress

Television
 2010 – Swayamvara – host(Suvarna TV Kannada)
 2014 – Thaka Dhimi Tha Dancing star – Judge (ETV Kannada)
 2015 – Putani Pantru Season 2 – Judge (Suvarna TV Kannada)
 2017 – Comedy Khiladigalu – Judge (Zee Kannada)
 2017 – Dance Karnataka Dance- Family War -Judge (Zee Kannada)
 2018 – Comedy Khiladigalu Season 2 -Judge (Zee Kannada)
 2018 – Dance Karnataka Dance Little Masters - Judge (Zee Kannada)
 2018 – Comedy Khiladigalu Championship -Judge (Zee Kannada) 
 2019 - Dance Karnataka Dance - Family War (Season 2) - Judge (Zee Kannada)
 2019 - Comedy Khiladigalu Season 3 - Judge (Zee Kannada)
 2020 - Comedy Khiladigalu Championship Season 2 - Judge (Zee Kannada)
 2021 - Dance Karnataka Dance Season 5 - Judge (Zee Kannada)
 2022 - Dance Karnataka Dance Season 6 - Judge (Zee Kannada)
 2022 - Comedy Khiladigalu Season 4 - Judge (Zee Kannada)

As dubbing artist
Amy Jackson (The Villain)

References

External links
 
Rakshita at Instagram

Living people
Actresses in Kannada cinema
Actresses in Telugu cinema
Actresses in Tamil cinema
Kannada film producers
Actresses from Bangalore
Indian actor-politicians
Indian film actresses
21st-century Indian actresses
Politicians from Bangalore
Businesswomen from Karnataka
Bharatiya Janata Party politicians from Karnataka
BSR Congress politicians
Janata Dal (Secular) politicians
21st-century Indian women politicians
21st-century Indian politicians
Film producers from Bangalore
Actresses in Kannada television
Indian television actresses
Year of birth missing (living people)
Women members of the Karnataka Legislative Assembly